Bombax anceps is a tree species now in the Malvaceae that was described by Jean Baptiste Louis Pierre from its range in Indochina.  The subspecies B. a. cambodiense has been reverted to species Bombax cambodiense Pierre.

Description 
It is a deciduous tree with a spiny trunk (illustrated), reaching 15 m in height.  The leaves are glabrous and digitate, with 4-7 leaflets.  The capsules enclose cottony seeds, like other species in the genus, and are 80–160 mm long.

Common names 
In Vietnamese Bombax anceps is called gạo hoa đỏ (describing its red flower) or gạo hai mặt.

References

Gallery

External links 
 
 
 Malaysian Flora: B. anceps (good illustrations, retrieved 2 December 2017)

anceps
Flora of Indo-China
Trees of Indo-China
Trees of Vietnam